Gambo-Ouango is a sub-prefecture in the Mbomou Prefecture of the south-eastern Central African Republic.

Sub-prefectures of the Central African Republic